DaVarryl Jerome Williamson (born July 25, 1968) is an American former professional boxer. A highly-touted amateur, he challenged once for the IBF world heavyweight title in 2005.

Early and personal life
Williamson was raised in poverty in the inner city Washington D.C., born to a mother addicted to drugs and a criminal father.  He spent his youth moving between foster homes and between schools until his father chose to resume contact at the age of 11. An accomplished high school football star, he attended Rochester Community and Technical College in Minnesota on a scholarship. Williamson later transferred on a scholarship to play for NCAA Division II Wayne State College in Nebraska, graduating in 1993.

He is married to Jennifer Williamson.

Boxing career

Amateur career
Williamson started boxing as an amateur at the age of 25. In January 1995, he received an offer to join the U.S. Olympic Education Center in Marquette, Michigan, in order to qualify at the 1996 Summer Olympics. Williamson failed to qualify, but joined the team as an alternate. Standing 6 ft 3 in tall, Williamson gained popularity for his punching power, mainly for his clubbing right-hand haymaker, which became known as "Touch of Sleep". As an amateur, Williamson won the National Golden Gloves heavyweight championships in 1996 and 1999, and United States national amateur championships in 1996, 1997 and 1998 and built a record of 120 wins, 17 losses and 1 draw, with 103 wins coming by knockout (88% KO rate).

Highlights
1996 Olympic Trials Heavyweight
Defeated Harold Sconiers KO 1
Defeated David Washington KO
Lost to Nate Jones on points

1996 Challengers Olympics Heavyweight
Defeated Lamon Brewster on points

1996 Olympics Heavyweight Box-Offs
Lost to Nate Jones on points

1997 United States Heavyweight Championships
Defeated James Jackson KO 1
Defeated Terry Smith KO 2
Defeated Calvin Brock KO 3

1997 World Championships in Budapest (Heavyweight)
Defeated Garth da Silva (N-Z) on points
Lost to Mark Simmons] (Can) on points

1998 Tournament in Tampere, Finland (Heavyweight)
Defeated Kai Brankarr (Fin) TKO 1

1998 United States Heavyweight Championships
Defeated Sam Sleezer TKO 2
Defeated Kevin Montly TKO 1
Defeated Stanley McClain KO 3
Defeated Calvin Brock on points

1998 Goodwill Games (Heavyweight) 
Defeated Mocerino KO 1
Defeated Kshinin KO 2
Lost to Félix Savón (Cub) KO 1

1999: United States Heavyweight Championships
Defeated Sifou Sua KO 4
Lost to Jason Estrada on points

1999: Golden Gloves (Heavyweight)
Defeated Devin Vargas KO
Defeated Patrick Nuwamu KO
Defeated Jason Estrada on points
Defeated Jeremiah Muhammad KO 2
Defeated Michael Bennett (boxer) KO 2

1999 Multi-National Tournament in Liverpool, England (Heavyweight:)
Defeated Kevin Evans (Gal) TKO
Lost to Garth Da Silva (N-Z) on points

2000 Olympic Trials Heavyweight
Defeated Anthony Stewart points
Defeated Mike Kirkman points
Lost to Michael Bennett (boxer) points

2000 Challengers Round Olympic Trials Heavyweight
Lost to Malik Scott points

Professional career
Williamson made his professional debut in 2000 at the age of 32. He won his first eighteen fights out of 19, with 16 of them by knockout (KO) inside the first five rounds before facing another undefeated hard-hitting heavyweight Joe Mesi. In the opening minute, Mesi hit Williamson with a right-left combination, unleashing a barrage of punches which ultimately put Williamson down. Davarryl was not able to get up at the count of ten, declaring Mesi the winner by first-round KO.

Afterwards, Williamson defeated Kendrick Releford by fifth-round TKO and Cuban contender Eliecer Castillo by majority decision before facing Wladimir Klitschko. The fight took place at Caesars Palace in Las Vegas, Nevada. Williamson dropped Klitschko forty seconds into the second round, but was unable to capitalize on it. An accidental head butt in the closing seconds of the fifth round caused Klitschko bleeding from a cut above his right eye. Due to the cut, the fight was prematurely stopped, with Klitschko being declared the winner by technical decision. Two of the judges scored the fight identically 49–46 in favor of Klitschko, while the third judge had Williamson winning 48–47.

Just one month after the bout, Williamson defeated former world champion, 39-year old Oliver McCall, who was on the comeback trail and lost 19 lbs for this bout, by unanimous decision. He then faced former world title challenger Derrick Jefferson less than three months later, stopping him in the second round. Both fights took place at Madison Square Garden. Following the win over Jefferson, Williamson received a title shot against Chris Byrd for the IBF world heavyweight title. The bout took place in Reno, Nevada, and was the main event of Don King's card that included James Toney fighting Dominick Guinn. The fight, which some observers expected to be "explosive", was marked by a series of feints and clinches. The bout went full twelve rounds, with Byrd being declared the winner by unanimous decision, with two judges scoring the fight 116–112 and one judge scoring it 115–113. The end of the fight was followed with boos from the crowd. Following the fight it was revealed Williamson had postponed elbow surgery.

Following the loss, Williamson won two fights, beating journeyman Maurice Wheeler and undefeated prospect Mike Mollo within four rounds each, before facing former world title challenger Kali Meehan on October 6, 2007 at Madison Square Garden. Williamson, who was 39 years old at the time, lost by sixth-round TKO. He got his last chance to fight for the title in 2009, facing Ray Austin in the WBC heavyweight title eliminator, but was stopped in the fourth round. After that, Williamson fought sporadically, having fought three times before retiring in 2014 after losing to Eric Molina at the age of 45.

Professional boxing record

|-
|align="center" colspan=8|27 Wins (23 knockouts, 4 decisions), 8 Losses (6 knockouts, 2 decisions)
|-
| align="center" style="border-style: none none solid solid; background: #e3e3e3"|Result
| align="center" style="border-style: none none solid solid; background: #e3e3e3"|Record
| align="center" style="border-style: none none solid solid; background: #e3e3e3"|Opponent
| align="center" style="border-style: none none solid solid; background: #e3e3e3"|Type
| align="center" style="border-style: none none solid solid; background: #e3e3e3"|Round
| align="center" style="border-style: none none solid solid; background: #e3e3e3"|Date
| align="center" style="border-style: none none solid solid; background: #e3e3e3"|Location
| align="center" style="border-style: none none solid solid; background: #e3e3e3"|Notes
|-align=center
|Loss
|27-8
|align=left| Eric Molina
|TKO
|5
|10/05/2014
|align=left| USC Galen Center, Los Angeles
|align=left|
|-
|Loss
|27-7
|align=left| Tony Grano
|KO
|4
|23/06/2012
|align=left| Seminole Hard Rock Hotel and Casino Hollywood, Hollywood, Florida
|align=left|
|-
|Win
|
|align=left| Michael Marrone
|KO
|7
|23/04/2011
|align=left| Nokia Theatre L.A. Live, Los Angeles, California
|align=left|
|-
|Loss
|
|align=left| Ray Austin
|TKO
|4
|31/10/2009
|align=left| Treasure Island Hotel and Casino, Las Vegas, Nevada
|align=left|
|-
|Win
|
|align=left| Carl Davis
|TKO
|5
|24/04/2009
|align=left| Scottrade Center, Saint Louis, Missouri
|align=left|
|-
|Win
|
|align=left| Cerrone Fox
|TKO
|2
|18/09/2008
|align=left| Figali Convention Center, Panama City
|align=left|
|-
|Loss
|
|align=left| Kali Meehan
|TKO
|6
|06/10/2007
|align=left| Madison Square Garden, New York City
|align=left|
|-
|Win
|
|align=left| Maurice Wheeler
|KO
|3
|06/07/2007
|align=left| Florida State Fairgrounds, Tampa, Florida
|align=left|
|-
|Win
|
|align=left| Mike Mollo
|TKO
|4
|06/05/2006
|align=left| DCU Center, Worcester, Massachusetts
|align=left|
|-
|Loss
|
|align=left| Chris Byrd
|UD
|12
|01/10/2005
|align=left| Reno Events Center, Reno, Nevada
|align=left|
|-
|Win
|
|align=left| Derrick Jefferson
|TKO
|2
|30/04/2005
|align=left| Madison Square Garden, New York City
|align=left|
|-
|Win
|
|align=left| Oliver McCall
|UD
|10
|13/11/2004
|align=left| Madison Square Garden, New York City
|align=left|
|-
|Loss
|
|align=left| Wladimir Klitschko
|TD
|5
|02/10/2004
|align=left| Caesars Palace, Las Vegas, Nevada
|align=left|
|-
|Win
|
|align=left| Elieser Castillo
|MD
|12
|17/04/2004
|align=left| Florida State Fairgrounds, Tampa, Florida
|align=left|
|-
|Win
|
|align=left| Kendrick Releford
|TKO
|9
|17/01/2004
|align=left| Seminole Casino, Coconut Creek, Florida
|align=left|
|-
|Loss
|
|align=left| Joe Mesi
|KO
|1
|27/09/2003
|align=left| HSBC Arena, Buffalo, New York
|align=left|
|-
|Win
|
|align=left| Robert Wiggins
|UD
|10
|10/01/2003
|align=left| Mohegan Sun, Uncasville, Connecticut
|align=left|
|-
|Win
|
|align=left| Corey Sanders
|TKO
|5
|26/07/2002
|align=left| Mountaineer Casino, Racetrack and Resort, Chester, West Virginia
|align=left|
|-
|Win
|
|align=left| Dale Crowe
|TKO
|3
|25/05/2002
|align=left| Las Vegas Hilton, Las Vegas, Nevada
|align=left|
|-
|Win
|
|align=left| Abdul Muhaymin
|TKO
|3
|13/04/2002
|align=left| Mountaineer Casino, Racetrack and Resort, Chester, West Virginia
|align=left|
|-
|Win
|
|align=left| Ed White
|TKO
|1
|29/03/2002
|align=left| Denver Coliseum, Denver, Colorado
|align=left|
|-
|Win
|
|align=left| Kevin McBride
|TKO
|5
|18/01/2002
|align=left| Paris Las Vegas, Las Vegas, Nevada
|align=left|
|-
|Win
|
|align=left| Harold Sconiers
|TKO
|1
|30/11/2001
|align=left| Reno Hilton Casino Resort, Reno, Nevada
|align=left|
|-
|Win
|
|align=left| Andrei Kopilou
|TKO
|3
|16/11/2001
|align=left| The Orleans, Las Vegas, Nevada
|align=left|
|-
|Win
|
|align=left| Derrick Ryals
|TKO
|3
|25/08/2001
|align=left| Flamingo Hilton, Laughlin, Nevada
|align=left|
|-
|Win
|
|align=left| Antuan Shazell
|TKO
|2
|04/08/2001
|align=left| United Palace Theater, Washington Heights, Manhattan
|align=left|
|-
|Win
|
|align=left| Marvin Hunt
|TKO
|1
|21/07/2001
|align=left| Caesars Palace, Las Vegas, Nevada
|align=left|
|-
|Win
|
|align=left| Antonio Colbert
|TKO
|1
|06/07/2001
|align=left| Reno Hilton Casino Resort, Reno, Nevada
|align=left|
|-
|Win
|
|align=left| Leroy Berbick
|TKO
|2
|25/05/2001
|align=left| Norfolk, Virginia
|align=left|
|-
|Win
|
|align=left| Bradley Rone
|UD
|4
|18/03/2001
|align=left| Riviera Casino, Black Hawk, Colorado
|align=left|
|-
|Win
|
|align=left| John Ray Lewis
|TKO
|1
|21/01/2001
|align=left| Riviera Casino, Black Hawk, Colorado
|align=left|
|-
|Loss
|
|align=left| Willie Chapman
|TKO
|4
|06/10/2000
|align=left| Hard Rock Hotel and Casino, Las Vegas, Nevada
|align=left|
|-
|Win
|
|align=left| Ronnie Smith
|RTD
|2
|24/08/2000
|align=left| Coeur d'Alene Casino, Worley, Idaho
|align=left|
|-
|Win
|
|align=left| Gregory Dial
|KO
|2
|04/08/2000
|align=left| Hard Rock Hotel and Casino, Las Vegas, Nevada
|align=left|
|-
|Win
|
|align=left| Paul Dowdy
|TKO
|1
|30/06/2000
|align=left| Denver Coliseum, Denver, Colorado
|align=left|
|}

Accolades 

 Williamson was inducted to Colorado Hall of Fame 2022

National Golden Gloves Champion - 1996, 1999
United States national amateur heavyweight champion – 1996, 1997, 1998 (first and only heavyweight to win the championships three times in a row)
10-Time National Amateur Boxing Champion
Goodwill Games Silver Medalist - 1998
U.S. Olympic Team - First Alternate - 1996
U.S. Olympic Festival Champion - 1995
American Boxing Classic Champion - 1995, 1996, 1999
National Police Athletic League Champion - 1999
His professional opponents have a combined record of 337–150–6

References

External links
DaVarryl Williamson's TOS Boxing Gym

Boxers from Colorado
Heavyweight boxers
National Golden Gloves champions
Northern Michigan University alumni
Winners of the United States Championship for amateur boxers
Wayne State Warriors football players
1968 births
Living people
American male boxers
Competitors at the 1998 Goodwill Games